KUAL-FM (103.5 MHz; "Cool 103.5") is a radio station licensed to Brainerd, Minnesota, United States.  The station is owned by Hubbard Broadcasting, Inc. and the broadcast license is held by HBI Radio Brainerd/Wadena, LLC.
. KUAL broadcasts an oldies/classic hits format.  During the holiday season, the station broadcasts holiday music along with the program "This Was Christmas".

KUAL is a sister station to KVBR 1340 (business news/talk), KLIZ 1380 (sports), KBLB 93.3 (country), WJJY-FM 106.7 (adult contemporary), and KLIZ-FM 107.5 (classic rock). All are located in a brand new modern broadcast facility located at 13225 Dogwood Drive, Baxter.

Hubbard Broadcasting announced on November 13, 2014 that it would purchase the Omni Broadcasting stations, including KUAL-FM. The sale was completed on February 27, 2015, at a purchase price of $8 million for the 16 stations and one translator.

KUAL previously aired a Country format known as "Froggy 103.5" using the callsign KFGI. In or around 2004, the then KFGI flipped to its current Oldies format branded as "Cool 103.5, Good Time Oldies" under the new callsign KUAL. 

In recent years, KUAL has shifted away from a 50s and 60s centered Oldies format more towards a Classic Hits leaning 60s and 70s Oldies format. To reflect these changes, KUAL dropped the "Good Time Oldies" slogan and adopted "The Lakes Greatest Hits" as it’s new slogan. Sister station KULO in Alexandria, which closely resembled KUAL format wise, had done similar, but shifted more towards an 80s centered Classic Hits format rather than a 60s and 70s slightly older leaning format like KUAL.

References

Previous logo

External links
COOL 103.5 official website

Radio stations in Minnesota
Oldies radio stations in the United States
Radio stations established in 1994
Hubbard Broadcasting
Brainerd, Minnesota
1994 establishments in Minnesota